"" ("", D. 839, Op. 52, No. 6, 1825), in English: "Ellen's Third Song", was composed by Franz Schubert in 1825 as part of his Op. 52, a setting of seven songs from Walter Scott's 1810 popular narrative poem The Lady of the Lake, loosely translated into German.

It is one of Schubert's most popular works. Beyond the song as originally composed by Schubert, it is often performed and recorded by many singers under the title "Ave Maria" (the Latin name of the prayer Hail Mary, and also the opening words and refrain of Ellen's song, a song which is itself a prayer to the Virgin Mary), in musically simplified arrangements and with various lyrics that commonly differ from the original context of the poem. It was arranged in three versions for piano by Franz Liszt.

The Lady of the Lake and the "Ave Maria"

In Scott's poem, the character Ellen Douglas, the Lady of the Lake (Loch Katrine in the Scottish Highlands), has gone with her exiled father to stay in the Goblin's cave as he has declined to join their previous host, Roderick Dhu, in rebellion against King James. Roderick Dhu, the chieftain of Clan Alpine, sets off up the mountain with his warriors, but lingers and hears the distant sound of the harpist Allan-bane, accompanying Ellen who sings a prayer addressed to the Virgin Mary, calling upon her for help. Roderick Dhu pauses, then goes on to battle.

Schubert's setting is said to have first been performed at the castle of Countess Sophie Weissenwolff in the little Austrian town of Steyregg and dedicated to her, which led to her becoming known as "the lady of the lake" herself.

The opening words and refrain of Ellen's song, namely "Ave Maria" (Latin for "Hail Mary"), may have led to the idea of adapting Schubert's melody as a setting for the full text of the traditional Roman Catholic prayer "Ave Maria". The Latin version of the "Ave Maria" is now so frequently used with Schubert's melody that it has led to the misconception that he originally wrote the melody as a setting for the "Ave Maria".

Position within the cycle
In 1825, Schubert composed a selection of seven songs from Scott's The Lady of the Lake. They were published in 1826 as his Opus 52.

The songs are not intended for a single performer: the three songs of Ellen are for a woman's voice with piano accompaniment, while the songs for Norman and Malcolm Graeme were intended for the baritone Johann Michael Vogl. Of the remaining two songs, one was for a male ensemble and the other for a female ensemble.

 "Ellens Gesang I", D. 837, Raste Krieger, Krieg ist aus / "Soldier rest! the warfare o'er"
 "Ellens Gesang II", D. 838, Jäger, ruhe von der Jagd / "Huntsman, rest! thy chase is done"
 "Bootgesang" (Hail to the Chief), D. 835, Triumph, er naht / "who in triumph approaches", for male voice quartet
 "Coronach" (Deathsong of the women and girls), D. 836, Er ist uns geschieden / "He is gone to the mountain", for female choir
 "Normans Gesang", D. 846, Die Nacht bricht bald herein ("Night will soon be falling")
 "Ellens Gesang III" (Hymne an die Jungfrau / Hymn to the Virgin), D. 839, Ave Maria! Jungfrau mild / "Ave Maria! maiden mild!"
 "Lied des gefangenen Jägers", D. 843, Mein Roß so müd / "My steed is tired"

Schubert composed the songs to the German texts. However, with the exception of No. 5, the songs were clearly intended to be published with the original English texts as well. This meant finding correspondences to Storck's sometimes quite free translations, which entailed significant difficulties.

Lyrics

Use in Fantasia (1940)
Walt Disney used Schubert's song in the final part of his 1940 film Fantasia, where he linked it to Modest Mussorgsky's Night on Bald Mountain in one of his most famous pastiches. The end of Mussorgsky's work blends with almost no break into the beginning of Schubert's song, and as Deems Taylor remarked, the bells in Night on Bald Mountain, originally meant to signal the coming of dawn, which cause the demon Chernobog to stop his dark worship and the ghosts to return to the grave, now seem to be church bells signalling the beginning of religious services. A procession of monks is shown walking along. The text for this version is sung in English, and was written by Rachel Field. This version also had three stanzas, like Schubert's original, but only the third stanza made it into the film (one line in the last stanza is partially repeated to show how it is sung in the film):

The version heard in Fantasia was arranged by Leopold Stokowski especially for the film, and unlike the original, which is for a solo voice, is scored for soprano and mixed chorus, accompanied by the string section of the Philadelphia Orchestra. The soloist is Julietta Novis. The Ave Maria sequence was later featured in Very Merry Christmas Songs, which is part of Disney Sing-Along Songs, as a background movie for the song "Silent Night".

See also

 "Ave Maria" by German composer Johann Sebastian Bach and French composer Charles Gounod
 "Ave Maria" by Russian composer Vladimir Vavilov, often misattributed to Italian composer Giulio Caccini
 "Ave Maria" by American R&B artist Beyoncé, a modern re-written rendition featured on her album I Am... Sasha Fierce.

References

External links
 
 Sheet music, Cantorion.org
 The Lady of the Lake, edition with notes by William J. Rolfe, Boston 1883, with the song on page 58, and notes on alternate words on page 177
, including "Hymn to the Virgin"

Lieder composed by Franz Schubert
1825 compositions
19th-century songs
Adaptations of works by Walter Scott